The Cook Mountains is a group of mountains bounded by the Mulock and Darwin glaciers in Antarctica. Parts of the group were first viewed from the Ross Ice Shelf by the British National Antarctic Expedition (1901–04). Additional portions of these mountains were mapped by a New Zealand party of the CTAE (1956–58), and they were completely mapped by the USGS from Tellurometer surveys and US Navy air photos, 1959–63.

Named by the NZ-APC for Captain James Cook.

Cook Mountains landforms include Bowling Green Col, Bowling Green Plateau, Bromwich Terrace, DeZafra Ridge, Soyuz-13 Rock, Schoonmaker Ridge, Wright Hill, and the Brown Hills.

See also
Butcher Ridge, near the polar plateau in the west part of the Cook Mountains
Gjelsvik Spur, a rock spur 2 nautical miles (4 km) northwest of Mount Ayres  in the Cook Mountains
Harper Ridge, extends north from the central part of the Finger Ridges in the Cook Mountains
Soyuz-18 Rock is a nunatak west of Cheney Bluff in the Cook Mountains

References

External links

Mountain ranges of the Ross Dependency
Hillary Coast
Oates Land